In Greek mythology, Aepytus (Ancient Greek: Αἵπυτος) was a king of Arcadia and the son of Hippothous.

Mythology 
He was reigning at the time when Orestes, in consequence of an oracle, left Mycenae and settled in Arcadia. There was at Mantineia a sanctuary, which down to the latest time no mortal was ever allowed to enter. Aepytus disregarding the sacred custom crossed the threshold, but was immediately struck with blindness, and died soon after.  He was succeeded by his son Cypselus and thus the great-grandfather of another Aepytus.

Note

References 

 Pausanias, Description of Greece with an English Translation by W.H.S. Jones, Litt.D., and H.A. Ormerod, M.A., in 4 Volumes. Cambridge, MA, Harvard University Press; London, William Heinemann Ltd. 1918. . Online version at the Perseus Digital Library
Pausanias, Graeciae Descriptio. 3 vols. Leipzig, Teubner. 1903.  Greek text available at the Perseus Digital Library.

Mythological kings of Arcadia
Kings in Greek mythology
Arcadian mythology
Mythological blind people